Mairy is a former commune in the Ardennes department in northern France.

On 15 September 2015, Mairy was annexed by the commune of Douzy.

Population

See also
Communes of the Ardennes department

References

Former communes of Ardennes (department)
Ardennes communes articles needing translation from French Wikipedia
Populated places disestablished in 2015